Hugill is a civil parish in the South Lakeland District of Cumbria, England.  It contains nine listed buildings that are recorded in the National Heritage List for England.  Of these, two are listed at Grade II*, the middle of the three grades, and the others are at Grade II, the lowest grade.  The parish is in the Lake District National Park and is almost completely rural, the only settlement being the village of Ings.  Most of the listed buildings are farmhouses and farm buildings, the others being a country house, a monument, a church, and a school later used as a parish hall.


Key

Buildings

References

Citations

Sources

Lists of listed buildings in Cumbria